Paleaepappus is a genus of flowering plants in the aster tribe within the sunflower family.

Species
The only known species is Paleaepappus patagonicus, native to Chubut Province in the Patagonia region of  southern Argentina.

References

Monotypic Asteraceae genera
Astereae
Endemic flora of Argentina
Taxa named by Ángel Lulio Cabrera